The Cheyenne County Jail, at 85 W. Second St. in Cheyenne Wells, Colorado, was built in 1894.  It was a work of Denver architect Robert S. Roeschlaub with some Romanesque Revival styling.  It is now operated as the Cheyenne Wells Old Jail Museum.  It was listed on the National Register of Historic Places in 1988.

It was operated as a jail from 1894 through sometime after 1937, then eventually was closed.  It became a museum in 1962 with the creation of the Eastern Colorado Historical Society, which operated until 1972 then was revived in 1976.  It is open during the summer.

References

External links

 Cheyenne Wells Old Jail Museum - Town of Cheyenne Wells

Jails on the National Register of Historic Places in Colorado
Romanesque Revival architecture in Colorado
Government buildings completed in 1894
Buildings and structures in Cheyenne County, Colorado
Jails in Colorado
Museums in Cheyenne County, Colorado
Prison museums in the United States
History museums in Colorado
National Register of Historic Places in Cheyenne County, Colorado